The 1986–87 Cypriot Fourth Division was the 2nd season of the Cypriot fourth-level football league. The championship was split into three geographical groups, representing the Districts of Cyprus. The winners were:
 Nicosia-Keryneia Group: Libanos Kormakiti
 Larnaca-Famagusta Group: Achyronas Liopetriou
 Limassol-Paphos Group: AEZ Zakakiou

The three winners were promoted to the 1987–88 Cypriot Third Division. Ten teams were relegated to regional leagues.

See also
 Cypriot Fourth Division
 1986–87 Cypriot First Division
 1986–87 Cypriot Cup

Cypriot Fourth Division seasons
Cyprus
1986–87 in Cypriot football